Örn Elías Guðmundsson, known professionally as Mugison (born 4 September 1976), is an Icelandic musician.

Early life 
In 1977, Guðmundsson and his family moved from Reykjavík to Ísafjörður. In 1982, his family made the move from Iceland to Cape Verde in Northwest Africa. The reason they moved was because his father was there as a part of a volunteer program teaching locals how to fish. Guðmundsson spent his childhood in Cape Verde owning various pet monkeys and swimming as a pastime. He did not start school until the age of 9.

From the age of 10 to 14, he lived in and around many parts of Reykjavík. At 14, he moved to Hrísey. During the winter, he was sent to a boarding school from the age of 14 to 17. This is where Guðmundsson began to explore and discover music. Prior to moving to Hrísey, he had been a swimmer and football player. He was not overly interested in the arts.

Career

Early career 
In 1990, whilst working in Hrísey, Mugison saw Kjartan H Grétarsson live in concert, which was "a major turning point in his life". Mugison was so fascinated by Kjartan's mysterious presence, most notably his hair, that he sought him out and requested the musician teach Mugison how to become an artist. Kjartan agreed, and they met every Wednesday in order for him to impart his knowledge, and expose Mugison to different kinds of music and literature, including Frank Zappa, the Beat Poets and key Icelandic poetry. This union has led to a lifelong friendship, with Kjartan H Grétarsson creating subsequent cover art for the album Mugiboogie.

After receiving a mentorship from Kjartan H Grétarsson, Mugison moved to Reykjavík in 1993 at the age of 17. This was the year Nirvana released In Utero and Björk put out Debut, both highly influential albums in Mugison's life. He attended Hamrahlíðaskóli Menntaskóli. He chose this particular school as so many artists had graduated from there, most notably Páll Óskar, who Mugison was a huge fan of.

During his time at Hamrahlíðaskóli, he befriended an influential music industry icon named Kiddi Kanína, who owned the iconic record shop Hljómalind. Kiddi was very involved with the early careers of Sigur Rós and Björk, and turned Mugison onto artists such as Sonic Youth and Pavement.

In 2000, Mugison went to London's Middlesex University to complete a Bachelor of Arts in Recording Art. During his time in the UK, he experimented with creating music on computers. Interested in creating more portable music options, Mugison visited an Apple Store to enquire when the laptop would be big enough to handle music, only to be told by a salesperson, unequivocally, that laptops would not ever be big enough to make music. At the same time, Björk was predicting that all music would be made on laptops in the near future in various interviews she gave. Sharing the same vision as someone as influential as Björk made Mugison even more determined that he was on the right path, so he purchased a second hand Apple 3G PowerBook with the sole intention to create music on it. During his studies in London, Digigram released the VX Pocket Soundcard. This new technology was so expensive that after Mugison purchased his prize possession he could not afford to pay rent for the rest of his semester, so had to sleep on friends sofas for the rest of his term in London. The investment was worth it and he began working on his debut album; Lonely Mountain.

Whilst working on his debut album, Mugison spent a lot of time listening to Andy Votel and Matthew Herbert, both of whom Mugison credited as influential in his music career.

Upon completing the record, he made 10 burnt copies and sent them out to various labels in hope that a record label would release it. The CD was sent to the most popular record labels at the time (4AD Records, XL Recordings etc.). He ran out of copies, but wanted to contact Twisted Nerve Records, so he farted in a mayonnaise jar, sealed the lid and posted it to the label accompanied by a note stating, "if you like the smell of this fart, you'll love my music". Andy Votel wrote back pledging to release his first split 7-inch single, with Andy also featuring on the vinyl record.

He also sent a copy to Matthew Herbert who ran Accidental Records, as Mugison was a great admirer of his work. Matthew responded to the record and agreed to release his debut album on Accidental. The artwork for the record and all subsequent Mugison CDs were all handmade. The CD packaging was ambitious with Mugison and his family, hand-stitching over 10,000 copies before putting them all on a boat to England. Matthew Herbert took Mugison under his wing and nurtured his talent, becoming another mentor to him. At this point in his career, Mugison had never played a live gig. In 2003, Herbert was booked on a three-week DJ tour of Japan; during this tour Herbert insisted he perform live, as his support act, thus Mugison began to finesse his live performance one-man show.

The Mugison show in the early days consisted of himself, alone with a guitar and various gadgets. He built himself 'The Mugibox', a box, no bigger than a suitcase, that contained all the equipment he needed to go out on the road (including his pants). He had discovered Ableton Live by this point, and played around with looping and various other tricks that the software enabled him to conjure up. He played wild, crashing guitar while mixing vocals and distorted breathing through a laptop. There were not many other performers at this time using Ableton Live, thus giving him a slight edge in that particular area.

Mugison was booked to play at Sónar 2003 in Barcelona, which turned out to be a monumental turning point in his career. Having grown disillusioned in his short time period of playing live, he treated Sónar as his last live gig. Playing in a basement parking garage, there were a handful of people to watch him, when suddenly, seconds after he started playing, the entire basement filled up with hundreds of people. Unbeknownst to Mugison, the reason for the sudden influx of people was because it had begun raining outside. However, the set was a hit, and spurred him on to persevere with the live element of his career.

Sónar 2003 was a turning point in Mugison's career, and as a result of the good publicity and general industry buzz created as a direct result of the show, he was booked to tour many headline tours around France, UK, Netherlands and Denmark. Touring became part of his life; one particular highlight was touring around Europe with fellow Icelandic band Múm in 2004.

A fortuitous chance encounter with Gruff Rhys from Super Furry Animals in London during 2003 led to Mugison performing as a supporting act for the Welsh band at The Royal Festival Hall. This was a particular highlight during his early career.

After many tours during 2003-2004, Mugison returned to Ísafjördur, and was asked to create the soundtrack to an Icelandic Film Niceland. Having no studio to create, the town kindly lent him the church in which he could record.

By early autumn 2004, Mugison had finished his second album Mugimama Is This Monkey Music? which was recorded in an abandoned house in Isafjordur, also donated by the town. He moved to Reykjavik to release the album and perform at Iceland Airwaves Festival 2004. Mugison was getting popular with the gig going fraternity. He also had his album release party at the (now defunct) NASA venue, which completely sold out. The album gained critical and commercial success.

Aldrei Fór ég Suður Festival 
Aldrei fór ég suður (I Never Went South) Festival is a music festival Mugison first held in 2004. It is the brainchild of Mugison and his father, Guðmundur Kristjánsson, who came up with the idea after playing on a music festival in London in 2003, and is named after Bubbi Morthens song of the same name.

Mugison got the idea while in London one summer performing at a Rough Trade music festival that lineup included a host of up-and-coming talent. He thought it would be fun to put on a similar festival only a bigger and more weird in Isafjördur. Mugison talked to some musician friends and everyone got excited about the idea. They even talked to Björk (about playing) when they met her downtown when they were drunk. She said they were "cutie pies" and for a long time they thought that meant "yes".

Even though Björk declined to perform, plenty of other people got excited about the idea of an all-day music festival where the only remuneration would be a damn good time. They figured Sigur Rós were too big so they asked them if they could just come over and do an acoustic set. And they showed up in cowboy hats and were doing hillbilly versions of all their old tunes. Mugison invited popular acts to perform, but he also extended the invitation to musicians with far lower profiles everyone from the local elementary-school choir to high-school garage bands to Isafjördur leather-sporting hair-metal act The Nine Elevens.

The festival rules for playing there are strict. No soundchecks and no backstage allowed, and each performing act would be informed of their playing order until just 10 minutes of getting on stage. There would be no monetary compensation, as all entrance would be free.

The inaugural festival in the spring of 2004 took place in a fish factory, followed the next year by a different factory that was in the middle of being converted to a theatre but still had fire-hazardous plastic sheets covering the inside walls.

Mirstumenti project 
The Mirstumenti is an electronic music instrument conceived by Mugison and his sound engineer. The idea for the Mirstument came during a tour in Europe in 2003, shortly after Sonar 2003. At the time Mugison was a one-man-band. Mugison and Palli (the sound-engineer) were fantasising about an alternative setup which did not involve just putting a lot of controllers on a table, hooking up adapters and cables to all the midi stuff. They thought it should be more of an instrument, so that people could see what was going on, and with just have one on/off button.

The main component is the 192 button keyboard which is an AXIS 64, using the "harmony table" or "Melodic table", with button controllers fitted around it. Mugison and his engineer also built a floor-station switch with many buttons, hiding the computer ("out of sight, out of mind"). The duo have also built a light-system that syncs with everything. Mugison premiered the instrument at the inaugural Sonar Reykjavik in February 2013.

Further career 
2005 saw Mugison go global with the musician playing approximately 200 gigs in one year whilst supporting his second album Mugimama Is This Monkey Music?. Gig highlights included supporting Fantômas in London at the HMV forum and playing Roskilde festival. He also shared stages with José González and Hot Chip.

The album was released in North America by Mike Pattons label IPECAC Records and Accidental Records released the album throughout Europe.

He also created another soundtrack for a film by the name of A Little Trip To Heaven.

During 2006 Mugison established his record label Mugiboogie, he was also growing tired of the computer troubadour label and wanted to play some rock and roll with a band. He moved back to The Westfjords with his young family, bought a house, converted the garage into a studio and started jamming with friends, this was going to be the basis of the next record.

Gig highlights of 2006 include: playing G-festival in the Faroe Islands and playing SPOT Festival for the second time (first time with a band).

2007 saw the release of Mugiboogie, his third studio album in October. Mugison wanted the album to sound timeless, so that one could not identify when it was recorded, the album comprises many different rock influenced styles including heavy, light and George Harrison-esq sounds. The idea was for it to sound like a 'Best Of' album. Following the release of Mugiboogie in Europe on his own label and Ipecac Records in North America, a booking agent from William Morris approached him to represent his touring interests in North America. Mugiboogie sold over 10,000 records in Iceland alone, with no radio support.

Gig highlights in 2008 supporting his third studio album include:
 Supporting Queens Of The Stone Age during their 2008 Canadian Tour
 Mugison's first US tour, from NY to LA in three weeks, with 2 piece band-setup with his good friend Davíð Þór Jónsson
 Popkomm in Berlin – the day Iceland went bankrupt 
 The Nightmare Before Christmas Curated by The Melvins and Mike Patton (ATP Festival) 
 Three headline tours around Europe plus a second appearance at Roskilde Festival 2008

2009 saw Mugison release a live album called 'A Reminder' which contained a few songs which had been modified over the years. He sold this through his website and completed a sold-out tour of Iceland with Björgvin Gíslasson.

Mugison was also asked to participate in an Amnesty International charity event whereby he played all 5 boroughs of New York in one day.

2011 saw the release of his fourth and most successful to date studio album; Haglel Haglél. The album sold in excess of 30,000 during 2011. Recorded entirely in Icelandic, and recorded on a simple two-track soundcard the album was casually recorded with friends in various houses and home made studios. Due to the phenomenal success of the record, Mugison was able to pay off various debts and as a thank you gesture to the people that bought the album he did three free concerts in Reykjavik at Harpa in December 2011. He performed the three concerts in one day, and they were all at maximum capacity. The middle performance was filmed live to air on RUV and transpired to be the highest rated TV show on RUV during 2011. Mugison also travelled around the country and performed free concerts in the following towns: Seyðisfjörður, Vestmannaeyjar, Bolungarvik and Akureyri (where he did 2 concerts).

All Mugison's albums are handmade, so to create 30,000 became a full-time job for some of his friends and family.

Discography 
 2003: Lonely Mountain
 2004: Niceland (Soundtrack)
 2004: Mugimama Is This Monkey Music?
 2005: Little Trip (Soundtrack)
 2007: Mýrin (Soundtrack)
 2008: Mugiboogie
 2009: Ítrekun
 2011: Haglél
 2016: Enjoy!

Collaborations
Dani Siciliano – All The Above – writer singer
Cheek Mountain Thief – "You Are The Demon"
Bubbi Morthens – Þorpið 2012
Björgvin Halldórsson –  "Minning".
Wrote a song and performed with band Reykjavík a song called "Sumarást".
Wrote a song with Múm (unreleased) performed in Poland, song called "Stamina"
Wrote a song with Icelandic reggae band Hjálmar – song called "Ljósvíkingur".
Sang two songs on Tómas R. Einarssons album Trúnó. songs are "Stolin Stef" and "Náungar Mínir"

On all albums Mugison has worked with Pétur Ben (who co-wrote Murr Murr) who is responsible for string arrangements on many of the songs, and also played guitar. His partner Rúna has featured on all of the albums, and his friend Biggi has mixed and mastered every album. Gudni Finnsson and Arnar Gislason have been the solid foundation on bass and drums, both live and in the studio, since 2006.

Awards 
 2004: Icelandic Music Awards – Performer of the Year
 2004: Icelandic Music Awards – Best Album for Mugimama Is This Monkey Music?
 2004: Icelandic Music Awards – Best Cover Art
 2004: Icelandic Music Awards – Song of the Year for "Murr Murr"
 2004: Icelandic Music Press – Album of the Year - Mugimama Is This Monkey Music?
 2006: Icelandic Music Awards – Performer of the Year
 2007: Icelandic Music Awards – Best Rock and Alternative Album of the Year for Mugiboogie
 2007: Icelandic Music Awards – Cover Art
 2007: Icelandic Music Awards – Best Video
 2007: Icelandic Music Press – Album of the Year for Mugiboogie
 2011: Icelandic Music Awards – Album of the Year for Haglél
 2011: Icelandic Music Awards – Songwriter of the Year
 2011: Icelandic Music Awards – Best Song of the Year
 2011: Icelandic Music Awards – Best Lyrics of the Year
 2011: Icelandic Music Awards – Most Popular Performer, voted by the general public

Personal life 
Guðmundsson got the nickname "Mugison" while on holiday visiting his father Muggi (Muggur) in Malaysia. His father is a karaoke singer, and as the crowds at the karaoke bars in the small fishing villages they were touring had problems pronouncing his name, they came to call him Mugison. Mugison is the Icelandic naming convention for the surname of someone who is "the son of Muggi".

After returning to Ísafjördur in 2002, Mugison met his partner Rúna Esradóttir. They currently live in Súðavík, Westfjords with their two sons, next door to Rúna's mother's house. His family is often involved in the making of his music. His wife often plays on his records, as well as his extended family.

References

External links

Official website
Interview with Mugison
Paste Magazine special on Mugison
 Mugison interviewed at OceanViewPress.com
 

1976 births
Living people
Ableton Live users
21st-century Icelandic male singers
Ipecac Recordings artists